Elsinore Valley is a graben rift valley in western Riverside County, California, a part of the Elsinore Trough. The Elsinore Valley is a graben between the Santa Ana Block to the southwest and the Perris Block on the northeast. It is a complex graben, divided lengthwise into several smaller sections by transverse faults.

The Elsinore Valley graben is bounded northeast side by the Glen Ivy longitudinal fault on the north shore of Lake Elsinore at the foot of the Clevelin Hills and similarly on the southeast by the Willard Fault that runs along the at the foot of the Santa Ana Mountains and parallel to the Elsinore Fault along the southwest shore of Lake Elsinore to Rome Hill and the Willard Fault continues on as the west side of the Temecula Valley graben and Wolf Valley graben. At the south end of Lake Elsinore the Wildomar Fault enters the lake just east of Rome Hill, running southeast on the northwest side of the Temecula Valley.

The Elsinore Valley is marked in the south by the rise between the Elsinore and Temecula Valley. In the north the valley bounds are marked by the Santa Ana Mountain ridges moved eastward along the Los Pinos and Lucerne transverse faults, dividing the Elsinore Valley from the Temescal Valley graben.

References 

 
Valleys of Riverside County, California
Inland Empire
Valleys of California